Dieter Grabner (born 8 June 1972) is an Austrian sports shooter. He competed in the men's 10 metre air rifle event at the 1996 Summer Olympics.

References

1972 births
Living people
Austrian male sport shooters
Olympic shooters of Austria
Shooters at the 1996 Summer Olympics
Place of birth missing (living people)
20th-century Austrian people